The Charlotte Hungerford Hospital is a 109-bed community hospital located in Torrington, Connecticut.

It also provides emergency department and other services at the Winsted Health Center, owned by a private foundation in the historic building that housed the Litchfield County Hospital, later known as Winsted Memorial Hospital.

Hospital rating data
The HealthGrades website contains the latest quality data for Charlotte Hungerford Hospital, as of 2015. For this rating section three different types of data from HealthGrades are presented: quality ratings for twenty inpatient conditions and procedures, twelve patient safety indicators, percentage of patients giving the hospital a 9 or 10 (the two highest possible ratings).

For inpatient conditions and procedures, there are three possible ratings: worse than expected, as expected, better than expected.  For this hospital the data for this category is:
 Worse than expected – 2
 As expected – 15
 Better than expected – 3
For patient safety indicators, there are the same three possible ratings. For this hospital safety indicators were rated as:
 Worse than expected – 1
 As expected – 10
 Better than expected – 1

Data for patients giving this hospital a 9 or 10 are:
 Patients rating this hospital as a 9 or 10 – 59%
 Patients rating hospitals as a 9 or 10 nationally – 69%

References

External links
 
 
 Winsted Health Center – Official Site

Hospitals in Connecticut